Julio Maximiliano Bevacqua  (born June 9, 1980 in Córdoba) is an Argentine retired footballer. His last club was Delfín SC.

External links
 Julio Bevacqua – Argentine Primera statistics at Fútbol XXI  
 Julio Bevacqua at BDFA.com.ar 
 Profile at playerhistory.com 

1980 births
Living people
Footballers from Córdoba, Argentina
Argentine footballers
Argentine expatriate footballers
Association football forwards
San Lorenzo de Almagro footballers
Club Almagro players
Chacarita Juniors footballers
Comisión de Actividades Infantiles footballers
Club Atlético Belgrano footballers
Atlético de Rafaela footballers
S.C. Braga players
Portimonense S.C. players
Panthrakikos F.C. players
S.D. Quito footballers
FC Vaduz players
Argentine expatriate sportspeople in Liechtenstein
Argentine Primera División players
Super League Greece players
Ecuadorian Serie A players
Primeira Liga players
Expatriate footballers in Portugal
Expatriate footballers in Greece
Expatriate footballers in Venezuela
Expatriate footballers in Liechtenstein
Expatriate footballers in Ecuador